Restless Road is an American country music band based in Nashville, Tennessee. The band is made up of Zach Beeken, Garret Nichols, and Colton Pack. The group was formed and finished fourth in the third season of the American singing competition series The X Factor in 2013.

The band signed a record deal with Sony Music Nashville and released their debut, self-titled EP on February 27, 2020. Also, the band has written songs for Rascal Flatts, Granger Smith, and David James.



Formation and The X Factor 
Beeken, a Pennsylvania native, and Pack, a West Virginia native, met in 2013 while auditioning as solo contestants on season 3 of The X Factor. It was there that they met future collaborator Kane Brown, who was also auditioning for the show.

Beeken and Pack were eliminated before making it to the Top 40, but producer Simon Cowell invited them back to audition as a group with singer Andrew Scholz. The new trio, called Restless Road, ultimately finished fourth on the season finale, which aired on December 19, 2013. Subsequently, the band moved to Nashville, Tennessee to pursue success as a country trio.

Personnel Changes 
In February 2014, Pack announced his decision to amicably depart from the band and was replaced by Jared Keim, whom the other members discovered through a Dan + Shay cover he had posted to Facebook.

In May 2015, Scholz left the band to pursue a career as a solo artist and was replaced by Garrett Nichols, a former contestant on season 13 of American Idol.

In 2018, Keim left the group and was replaced by a returning Pack.

Restless Road  
After the dissolution of a record deal, Beeken and Nichols began working as bartenders in Nashville. While Pack was working construction and releasing music in West Virginia, Kane Brown contacted him after seeing his cover of "Good As You," a song by Brown. Brown, an RCA Nashville/Zone 4 artist, was beginning to develop new acts under his own label imprint, and he offered Restless Road a record deal. This led to Pack rejoining the band, and in November 2019, they went into the studio with Dann Huff to begin recording a debut project.

On January 6, 2020, Brown invited Restless Road onstage during his sold-out Staples Center concert to premiere their collaboration, "Take Me Home" a track inspired by John Denver's "Take Me Home, Country Roads." Brown and Restless Road released the song and its music video in February 2020. It later peaked at No. 7 on Billboard's Digital Song Sales chart.

Later that month, on February 27, the band released Restless Road, a four-song EP including "Take Me Home." That same day, they performed "Take Me Home" together with Brown on the Today show.

On October 15, 2020, Restless Road signed a worldwide publishing deal with Sony/ATV. In CMT's program Off The Road With Restless Road, which aired October 16, the band revealed they were working with Huff on their debut album.

Discography

Extended plays 

 Restless Road (Sony Music Nashville, 2020)

Singles

References 

RCA Records Nashville artists
Country music groups from Tennessee
Musical groups from Nashville, Tennessee
Musical groups established in 2013
2013 establishments in Tennessee
The X Factor (American TV series) contestants